The Fokker C.XI-W was a reconnaissance seaplane designed to operate from warships that was produced in the Netherlands in the mid-1930s. It was the result of a Royal Netherlands Navy specification of 1935 requesting such an aircraft. Fokker's response was a conventional single-bay biplane with staggered wings of unequal span braced by N-struts. The pilot and observer sat in tandem, open cockpits, and the undercarriage consisted of twin pontoons. The wings were of wooden construction with plywood and fabric covering, and the fuselage was of steel tube, also covered with fabric.

The prototype first flew on 20 July 1935. After successful catapult trials, an order for a further 13 C.XI-Ws was placed, the aircraft being used to equip the cruisers HNLMS Tromp and HNLMS De Ruyter while operating in European waters; but most were sent to the Netherlands East Indies to equip the Navy there. Following the German invasion of the Netherlands in 1940, the last surviving C.XI-W in Europe was successfully evacuated to the UK on 22 May.  From there, it was also shipped to the Netherlands East Indies. None seem to have survived past March 1942.

Specifications

See also

References

 
  
 
 

1930s Dutch military reconnaissance aircraft
C 11
Floatplanes
Single-engined tractor aircraft
Biplanes
Aircraft first flown in 1935